The following is a list of ecoregions in Sri Lanka. Due to High rainfall and even sunlight throughout the year, Sri Lanka exhibits a great variety in ecoregions in all living habitats. Together with Western Ghats, Sri Lanka forms Western Ghats and Sri Lanka hotspot. It is considered one of the eight super-hotspots. Some of the ecoregions also included in Global 200 list too.

Terrestrial ecoregions

Tropical and subtropical moist broadleaf forests
Sri Lanka lowland rain forests
Sri Lanka montane rain forests

Tropical and subtropical dry broadleaf forests
Sri Lanka dry-zone dry evergreen forests

Deserts and xeric shrublands
Deccan thorn scrub forests

Freshwater ecoregions
Sri Lanka Dry Zone
Sri Lanka Wet Zone

Marine ecoregions 
West and South Indian Shelf
 South India and Sri Lanka

Global 200

Terrestrial
Sri Lanka lowland rain forests
Sri Lanka montane rain forests

Freshwater
Southwestern Sri Lanka rivers and streams

See also
Lists of ecoregions by country

References

 
Sri Lanka
Ecoregions